Ilema kosemponica is a moth in the family Erebidae first described by Embrik Strand in 1914. It is found in Taiwan.

The wingspan is 29–37 mm.

References

Moths described in 1862
Lymantriinae